Costantinella is a genus of anamorphic fungi in the family Morchellaceae and class Pezizomycetes

Species
The Global Biodiversity Information Facility lists:
 Costantinella athrix Nannf.
 Costantinella clavata Hol.-Jech.
 Costantinella cristata Matr.
 Costantinella micheneri (Berk. & M.A.Curtis) S.Hughes
 Costantinella palmicola M.K.M.Wong, Yanna, Goh & K.D.Hyde
 Costantinella phragmitis M.K.M.Wong, Yanna, Goh & K.D.Hyde
 Costantinella terrestris (Link) S.Hughes

References

External links
 

Morchellaceae